Bandini Kursar (also Romanized as Bandīnī Kūrsar; also known as Band Bonī, Bandeynī, Bāndīnī, and Bandīnī) is a village in Zarabad-e Sharqi Rural District, Zarabad District, Konarak County, Sistan and Baluchestan Province, Iran. At the 2006 census, its population was 55, in 13 families.

References 

Populated places in Konarak County